Kathryn "Kathie" Hess Crouse (born December 2, 1969) is an American politician and activist serving as a member of the West Virginia House of Delegates from the 13th district. She was appointed by Governor Jim Justice on December 2, 2021.

Early life and education 
Born and raised in Charleston, West Virginia, Crouse earned an associate degree in science and Bachelor of Science degree in microbiology and molecular biology from West Virginia State University.

Career 
From 1998 to 2001, Crouse managed a Steak Escape restaurant. After earning her bachelor's degree, she worked as an analytical technician for Dow Chemical Company. From 2001 to 2004, she served as a microbiologist in the West Virginia Office of Laboratory Services. She was an unsuccessful candidate for the Putnam County Board of Education in 2010 and West Virginia House of Delegates in 2016. Crouse has been the president of the West Virginia Home Educators Association and a commissioner of the West Virginia State Athletic Commission. She was also a board member of the Putnam County Convention and Visitors Bureau. Crouse was appointed to the West Virginia House of Delegates in December 2021.

Personal life 
Crouse lives in Buffalo, West Virginia.

References 

Living people
Republican Party members of the West Virginia House of Delegates
People from Charleston, West Virginia
Politicians from Charleston, West Virginia
West Virginia State University alumni
People from Buffalo, West Virginia
People from Putnam County, West Virginia
Homeschooling advocates
1969 births